Pursekhlu (also Romanized as Pūrsekhlū; also known as Porsekhlū) is a village in Owch Tappeh-ye Sharqi Rural District, in the Central District of Meyaneh County, East Azerbaijan Province, Iran. At the 2006 census, its population was 307, comprised in 64 families.

References 

Populated places in Meyaneh County